Colmenar is a municipality in the province of Málaga, in Andalusia, southern Spain.

Colmenar has been populated since the Neolithic age, as testified by the remains found at the Cueva de las Pulseras. After the Reconquest, the town was named after a nearby farm known as Colmenar (Spanish: "apiary") for its great number of beehives. The history of the village began in 1487, but it is not before 1777 that it became independent as a township.

Colmenar houses the region's medical center.

Main sights

On top of the hill, overlooking the village and its surrounding valleys, is the hermitage of La Santísima Virgen de la Candelaria. It was built in the 17th century and is nowadays declared a historical local monument. The hermitage is consecrated to the patron saint of Colmenar.

References

Municipalities in the Province of Málaga